A Caribbean Mystery is a work of detective fiction by British writer Agatha Christie, first published in the UK by the Collins Crime Club on 16 November 1964 and in the United States by Dodd, Mead and Company the following year. The UK edition retailed at sixteen shillings (16/-) and the US edition at $4.50. It features the detective Miss Marple.

Two reviewers at the time the novel was published said that Agatha Christie was returning to the top of her form. A critic writing in 1990 judged this plot to be standard fare for any writer who travels to the Caribbean and needs double duty out of a vacation.

Two of the major characters reappear in the novel Nemesis, published in 1971. Jason Rafiel reappears posthumously, and his assistant Esther Walters assists Miss Marple in the early chapters of the subsequent story.

Plot summary
This story takes place at the Golden Palm resort on the Caribbean island of St Honoré.  Miss Marple's nephew has paid for her to holiday there after a bout of ill health. She speaks with Major Palgrave, a well-travelled man with many stories to share. She sits, half listening, until Palgrave tells a story about a man who got away with murder more than once. When Palgrave asks her if she wants to see a picture of a murderer, she listens intently – but after he finds the snapshot in his wallet, he suddenly changes the subject. Miss Marple looks up to see why and spots several people nearby.

The next day, when the maid Victoria finds Major Palgrave dead in his room, Miss Marple is convinced he was murdered. She asks Dr Graham to find the photo he mentioned, pretending it is of her nephew, but it is not found. Meanwhile, she interviews the others: Tim and Molly Kendal, owners of the hotel; the Prescotts, a clergyman and his sister; Mr Jason Rafiel, a tycoon confined to a wheelchair; Jackson, his nurse/masseur/attendant/valet; Esther Walters, his secretary; the American Lucky Dyson and her husband, Greg; and Edward and Evelyn Hillingdon. On the beach, Miss Marple sees Señora de Caspearo, a woman on holiday who says she remembers Major Palgrave because he had an 'evil eye'. Miss Marple corrects her that he had a glass eye, but she still says that it was evil.

Victoria informs the Kendals that she did not remember seeing the high blood pressure medication, Serenite, in Major Palgrave's room before his death, although it was found on his table after his death. That night, Victoria is found stabbed to death. Molly begins having nightmares. Miss Marple finds Jackson looking at Molly's cosmetics; he says that if belladonna were added to one of them, it would cause nightmares. The following night, Tim finds Molly unconscious on the floor, apparently having taken an overdose of sleeping pills. The police are involved, and the cook, Enrico, tells them he saw Molly holding a steak knife before going outside. Miss Marple asks the others if Major Palgrave told people about the photo. Others claim Palgrave said it was not a photo of a wife killer but a husband killer. When police realize that the high blood pressure medicine did not belong to Major Palgrave, his body is exhumed and the autopsy reveals that he died by poison, as Miss Marple expected.

At night, Miss Marple is woken by the sounds of a search party. She is told that Tim woke up to find his wife missing. They find what seems to be her body in a creek, but it turns out to be Lucky; the two women resemble one another. 

Miss Marple abruptly realises who the major saw that night when he recognised the person in the snapshot as someone on the island. She wakes Mr Rafiel and Jackson, calling herself Nemesis, and they go to the Kendals' house. There they find Tim offering Molly a drink. Miss Marple tells Jackson to take the glass away. She says there is a deadly narcotic in it. While Jackson holds Tim down, She explains that Tim is the wife killer recognised by Major Palgrave. Miss Marple had thought Palgrave saw the Hillingdons and the Dysons over her right shoulder as they were coming up the beach, but had just realised that he had a glass eye on the left, so he could not have seen them. Tim and Molly were sitting on her left. Further, the story that the major told Miss Marple of the husband serially killing his wives and not getting caught, was the story of Tim Kendal. Tim was planning to kill Molly soon, and so had to kill Major Palgrave when he recognised Tim. He also killed Victoria, who remembered the Serenite being in the wrong room. Tim put belladonna in Molly's cosmetics to make her appear mad to the others. Tim had asked his wife to meet him by the creek, but Molly had been distracted by a vision due to the belladonna and wandered off. Tim saw Lucky and mistook her for Molly in the darkness. He was about to poison Molly when Miss Marple interrupted him.

Esther Walters suddenly insists that Tim is not a killer. Tim shouts at her to keep quiet. He had been planning to marry Esther, after Molly's death, because he had heard that she was going to inherit a large sum of money from Jason Rafiel.

Mr Rafiel chooses to invest some money in Molly when she takes on running the Golden Palm resort herself. Miss Marple takes her flight home to England after her holiday in the tropical warmth.

Characters
Miss Marple: An elderly spinster detective with an eye for detail and unexpected clues, with a "mind like a sink". She is sent on a Caribbean holiday by her nephew.
Major Palgrave: An elderly, garrulous man with a glass eye who tells stories from past, some of which stories have photographs or news clips to illustrate them.
Tim Kendal: A man in his thirties married to Molly Kendal, who marries her using false references and starts the hotel with her, using her money.
Molly Kendal: Tim's pretty young wife who starts the hotel where the story takes place with him. She eventually believes she has fallen mentally ill and confides it to Evelyn, although her symptoms are the result of being poisoned.
Jason Rafiel: A cantankerous old man with a large fortune and an unexpectedly kind spirit, who takes a shine to Miss Marple.
Esther Walters: Jason Rafiel's secretary, (the widow of a poor provider) with a child at school in England.
Victoria: A St Honoré native who is the one to discover Major Palgrave's death and the mysterious bottle of Serenite. She has a common-law marriage with two children and is the second victim to be killed.
Greg Dyson: A nature lover, who is now married to Lucky, his second wife.
Lucky Dyson: An attractive American woman who is married to Greg. She had plotted to kill his first wife, along with Edward Hillingdon, whom she tricked into guilt for his actions, and then seduced. She is the third murder victim.
Edward Hillingdon: The husband of Evelyn and an avid nature lover. He has children at a boarding school and has an affair with Lucky.
Evelyn Hillingdon: A woman who does not love her husband Edward but stays with him both for their public image and for their children.
Señora de Caspearo: A South American woman on holiday who opposes ugliness and, therefore Major Palgrave and Jason Rafiel. She remarks on Major Palgrave's glass eye as an evil eye.
Miss Prescott: An elderly woman who enjoys gossiping and has come on holiday with her brother, Canon Prescott.
Canon Prescott: Miss Prescott's brother, a member of the clergy, who dislikes his sister's gossiping.
Dr Graham: The St Honoré doctor, slowly retiring from practice, who treats Miss Marple who pretends to be ill, cares for Molly and confirms the deaths of the murdered people.
Jackson: Mr Rafiel's valet/masseur/attendant who (by admission to Miss Marple) worked at a cosmetic company.

Literary significance and reception

After lukewarm reviews of her two previous novels, Francis Iles (Anthony Berkeley Cox) felt that the writer was back on form in his review in The Guardian'''s issue of 11 December 1964: "Mrs Agatha Christie has done it again. In A Caribbean Mystery she tells the reader explicitly what is going to happen; and yet when it does, nine out of ten will be taken completely by surprise – as I was. How does she do it? For the rest, it is Miss Marple this time who is in charge of the story; and all one can guess is that the setting is a Caribbean island."

Maurice Richardson in The Observer of 15 November 1964 began, "A most encouraging return to somewhere very near her best unputdownable form. ... Suspicion nicely distributed among guests, many of them raffish adulterers. Not very hard to guess, but quite suspenseful. Good varied characterisation including a particularly excellent octogenarian tycoon." Towards the end of the year, Richardson again commented on the book in a special Books of the Year: A Personal Choice column when he said, "Agatha Christie makes one of those gratifying veteran's comebacks."

The Daily Mirror of 21 November 1964 wrote: "Not quite at the top of her form. A Miss Marples (sic) story which addicts won't find as unsolvable as usual."

Robert Barnard said of this novel, that it was "In the tradition of all those package-tour mysteries written by indigent crime writers who have to capitalize on their meagre holidays. Nothing much of interest, but useful for illustrating the 'fluffification' of Miss Marple. Reuses a ploy from Appointment with Death."

"There is no more cunning player of the murder game than Agatha Christie." — Sunday Times"Throws off the false clues and misleading events as only a master of the art can do." — The New York TimesDedication
The novel is dedicated to John Cruikshank Rose, "with happy memories of my visit to the West Indies". Christie and her husband Max Mallowan became friends with John Rose in 1928 at the archaeological site at Ur. He was the architectural draftsman and when Max was in charge of the dig in Greater Syria at Tell Arpachiyah, Iraq in 1932, he hired Rose to be his draftsman. Rose was Scottish, and as Christie described him, "a beautiful draughtsman, with a quiet way of talking, and a gentle humour that I found irresistible."

References in other works
The millionaire Jason Rafiel appears again, posthumously, in the novel Nemesis where he sends Miss Marple on a case specifically because of her success in solving the events related in A Caribbean Mystery.

 Adaptations

Television

A 1983 US TV movie adaptation starred Helen Hayes as Miss Marple and Barnard Hughes as Mr Rafiel. The New York Times says that Miss Marple has "a carload of suspects" to figure out why her friend was killed, in this film that first aired 22 October 1983. The screenplay was credited to Sue Grafton, later a mystery writer, and Steve Humphrey.

A BBC TV adaptation starring Joan Hickson was shown in 1989 as part of the series Agatha Christie's Miss Marple, with Donald Pleasence co-starring as Mr Rafiel. Few changes were made from the novel: the Prescotts and Señora de Caspearo were omitted, Miss Marple holidayed on Barbados rather than the fictional island of "St Honoré" (the name Honoré reappears as the fictional main town in the BBC series Death in Paradise that began airing in 2011), and the blood pressure medication was renamed Tetrauwolfide. The production was made and aired after the production of Nemesis, leading to some viewer confusion. The Nemesis episode was in Season 3 as Episode 4 airing on 1 January 2009 in the UK, while A Caribbean Mystery was aired as Season 6 Episode 1, airing 16 June 2013 in the UK, over 4 years later. US release was on 16 September 2014.

In the earlier production, the part of Jason Rafiel was portrayed by Frank Gatliff, rather than Donald Pleasence. The 1989 version is the only adaptation as of 2017 to be filmed in the Caribbean, specifically on location on the island of Barbados; the 1983 TV movie was shot in California, while the 2013 version was filmed in Cape Town.

In 2013, the book was adapted for the sixth series of ITV's Agatha Christie's Marple, starring Julia McKenzie as Miss Marple and co-starring Antony Sher as Jason Rafiel, Oliver Ford Davies as Major Palgrave, Hermione Norris as Evelyn Hillingdon and Robert Webb and Charity Wakefield as the Kendalls. The characters are much the same as in the novel, and the location is the same. At the end, Tim tries to shoot Molly rather than poison her, but the gun's bullets have been replaced with blanks. Like other episodes in the previous series, it includes characters based on real persons. One is fledgling novelist Ian Fleming, who needs a name for his spy hero. The other is ornithologist James Bond (Charlie Higson), who begins a lecture to his fellow guests by introducing himself as "...Bond, James Bond", which solves Fleming's problem. (Fleming, who was an avid bird-watcher, did take the name from the ornithologist, though they had not met.)

As with the Joan Hickson versions, Nemesis (1987) was filmed prior to A Caribbean Mystery (1988).  There are some continuity issues: in the 2009 version of Nemesis, Jason Rafiel is a German writer, but in A Caribbean Mystery (2013), he is an English chemical manufacturer. Miss Marple does not refer to herself as Nemesis at any time in this adaptation, despite herself and Mr Rafiel associating the name Nemesis with her in both novels. Just like in the Joan Hickson versions, Mr Rafiel is portrayed by different actors: Antony Sher portrays him here, but in Nemesis, he makes voice appearances by Herbert Lom (who previously appeared in the 2004 version of The Murder at the Vicarage as Monsieur Dufosse).

The novel was adapted as a 2016 episode of the French television series Les Petits Meurtres d'Agatha Christie.

Radio
Michael Bakewell wrote a BBC Radio adaptation first broadcast in October 1997, with June Whitfield as Miss Marple. Señora de Caspearo is omitted but the plot of the novel is generally retained.

Publication history
 1964, Collins Crime Club (London), 16 November 1964, Hardcover, 256 pp
 1965, Dodd Mead and Company (New York), Hardcover, 245 pp
 1966, Fontana Books (Imprint of HarperCollins), Paperback, 157 pp
 1966, Pocket Books (New York), Paperback, 176 pp
 1976, Ulverscroft Large-print Edition, Hardcover, 316 pp
 1979, Greenway edition of collected works (William Collins), Hardcover, 256 pp; 
 1979, Greenway edition of collected works (Dodd Mead), Hardcover, 256 pp
 2006, Marple Facsimile edition (Facsimile of 1964 UK first edition), 6 March 2006, Hardcover; 
2008, Indian Version (ASIAN);  Odyssey RS. 150

The novel was serialised in the Star Weekly Novel'', a Toronto newspaper supplement, in two abridged instalments from 16 to 23 January 1965, with each issue containing an uncredited cover illustration.

References

External links
A Caribbean Mystery at the official Agatha Christie website

1964 British novels
Collins Crime Club books
Miss Marple novels
Novels set in the Caribbean
Novels set in hotels
British novels adapted into films
British novels adapted into television shows